Bernadette Iguptark Tongelik (1931-1980) was an Inuk artist known for her sculptural works. Tongelik was born in Wager Bay, Northwest Territories and died in Repulse Bay (Naujaat), Northwest Territories, both of which are now part of Nunavut. 

Her work is included in the collections of the National Gallery of Canada, the Government of Nunavut and the Winnipeg Art Gallery.

References

 1931 births
 1980 deaths
20th-century Canadian artists
20th-century Canadian women artists
Inuit artists
Inuit from Nunavut
Artists from Nunavut
Canadian women sculptors
People from Naujaat
20th-century Canadian sculptors